Üzümcü is a Turkish surname. Notable people with the surname include:

 Ahmet Üzümcü (born 1951), Turkish diplomat
 Levent Üzümcü (born 1972), Turkish actor
 Tuna Üzümcü (born 1982), Turkish footballer

See also
 Üzümçü, village in Azerbaijan

Uzumcu